Gorden Wagener (born September 3, 1968, in Essen) is a German car designer, and is the chief design officer for Mercedes-Benz Group AG.

Career
Wagener studied Industrial Design at the University of Duisburg-Essen (1990–1993), after which he specialized his studies in Transportation Design at The Royal College of Art in London. After college, he worked as an exterior designer for Volkswagen, Mazda and General Motors.

In 1997 he joined Mercedes-Benz as a transportation designer and became the manager for the exterior and interior styling of the R-,ML- and GL-Class models in 1999 and moving onto the A-, B-, C-, E-, CLK- and CLS-Class in 2002. He moved to the Advanced Design studio in the US in 2006 and became Director of Design Strategy and Global Advanced Design in 2007. The following year he was promoted to Vice President Design of Daimler AG where he developed the company style called "sensual purity" in 2009.

Wagener was appointed Daimler's Chief Design Officer in 2016, becoming a board member of the company.

He was awarded the honorary title of Professor Honoris Causa from the Moholy-Nagy University of Art and Design in Budapest in 2009 and in 2010 he was awarded an honorary doctorate from the Technical University of Sofia.

He was awarded The American Prize for Design in 2017 in conjunction with Good Design by the Chicago Athenaeum and the European Centre for Architecture Art Design and Urban Studies.

Notable designs

Mercedes-Benz A-Class
Mercedes-Benz S-Class (W221)
Mercedes-Benz GLE-Class
Mercedes-Benz GLC-Class
Mercedes-EQ
Mercedes-Benz SLR McLaren
Mercedes-AMG ONE
Vision Mercedes-Maybach 6
Mercedes-Benz F015 concept

References

External links

1968 births
Living people
German automobile designers
Alumni of the Royal College of Art
Mercedes-Benz designers